Trifurcula bleonella is a moth of the family Nepticulidae. It was described by Pierre Chrétien in 1904. It is known from the Iberian Peninsula, France, Austria, Croatia, Hungary, the southern part of the Balkan Peninsula, Ukraine, southern Russia and Georgia.

The larvae feed on Linum species, including L. narbonense. They mine the stem of their host plant.

References

Nepticulidae
Moths of Europe
Moths of Asia
Moths described in 1904